Lamprolenis is a monotypic butterfly genus of the subfamily Satyrinae in the family Nymphalidae. Its one species is Lamprolenis nitida.

References

Satyrini
Monotypic butterfly genera
Taxa named by Frederick DuCane Godman
Taxa named by Osbert Salvin